The Red Flag Labour Unions was a trade union movement in Burma, linked to the Red Flag Communist Party. On 3 July 1946, the British governor of Burma Sir Henry Knight banned the Red Flag Labour Unions and the related Red Flag Cultivators Unions.

References

Communism in Myanmar
Trade unions in Myanmar